Lesueurillidae is an extinct family of paleozoic molluscs (gastropods?) with anisostrophically coiled shells of uncertain position (Gastropoda?) (according to the taxonomy of the Gastropoda by Bouchet & Rocroi, 2005).

Taxonomy 
The taxonomy of the Gastropoda by Bouchet & Rocroi, 2005 categorizes Lesueurillidae in the superfamilia Euomphaloidea within the Paleozoic molluscs with anisostrophically coiled shells of uncertain position (Gastropoda?). This family has no subfamilies.

Genera 
Genera in the family Lesueurillidae include
 Eccyliopterus Remelé, 1888
 Eccyliopterus abendanoni
 Eccyliopterus alatus (Roemer, 1876) - type species
 Eccyliopterus corniculum
 Eccyliopterus declivis Koken, 1925 - synonym: Eccyliopterus spirillum.
 Eccyliopterus incresens
 Eccyliopterus ottawaensis
 Eccyliopterus owenanus
 Eccyliopterus regularis - synonym: Eccyliopterus princeps.
 Eccyliopterus replicata
 Eccyliopterus septiferus
 Eccyliopterus tolli
 Eccyliopterus vagrans
 Lesueurilla Koken, 1898 - type genus of the family Lesueurillidae
 Lesueurilla acutangulum
 Lesueurilla bohemica
 Lesueurilla beloitensis
 Lesueurilla dilatata
 Lesueurilla grandis
 Lesueurilla helix
 Lesueurilla infundibulum (Koken, 1896) - type species
 Lesueurilla isabellaensis
 Lesueurilla kushanensis
 Lesueurilla louderbacki
 Lesueurilla magna
 Lesueurilla prima
 Lesueurilla shirakii
 Lesueurilla sinkiangensis
 Mestoronema P. J. Wagner, 2002
 Mestoronema bipatellare Koken, 1925 - type species
 Mestoronema marginalis (Koken, 1925)
 Mestoronema scotica (Longstaff, 1924)

Description 
Fossils of family Lesueurillidae has sharp peripheral band and a short notch formed from deep V-shaped sinus. They are similar to Maclurites but they differ in early ontogenesis from them.

References